White Hotel is a documentary film produced by American filmmakers Dianne Griffin and Tobi Solvang. It was filmed in Eritrea in Eastern Africa. The film focuses on the issue of HIV/AIDS infection in Eritrea.

When two women with a video camera follow an American HIV research team to Eritrea, Africa, they are seduced by a land of joy, repression, sensuality, and sexual mutilation. White Hotel is the tourist residence where Griffin and Solvang begin their journey. Still, their journalistic objectivity is shattered by the circumstances they encounter turning their documentary into an intimate investigation of their own capacities to love, suffer and forgive.

White Hotel was picked up for distribution by Jane Balfour Films in 2003. It was released on VHS in 2004.

References

External links
 
White Hotel description at the United Nations Association Film Festival
Review at realtalkreviews.com

Documentary films about HIV/AIDS
Films set in Eritrea
Films shot in Eritrea
Health in Eritrea
2004 documentary films
2004 films
2000s English-language films
American documentary films
HIV/AIDS in American films
2000s American films